5F-APINACA (also known as 5F-AKB-48 or 5F-AKB48) is an indazole-based synthetic cannabinoid that has been sold online as a designer drug. Structurally it closely resembles cannabinoid compounds from patent WO 2003/035005 but with a 5-fluoropentyl chain on the indazole 1-position, and 5F-APINACA falls within the claims of this patent, as despite not being disclosed as an example, it is very similar to the corresponding pentanenitrile and 4-chlorobutyl compounds which are claimed as examples 3 and 4.

5F-APINACA was first identified in South Korea. It is expected to be a potent agonist of the CB1 receptor and CB2 receptor. Its metabolism has been described in literature.

Pharmacology
5F-APINACA acts as a full agonist with a binding affinity of 1.94 nM at CB1 and 0.266 nM at CB2 cannabinoid receptors.

Legality

In the United States, 5F-APINACA is a Schedule I controlled substance.

5F-APINACA is an Anlage II controlled drug in Germany since July 2013.

As of October 2015, 5F-APINACA is a controlled substance in China.

5F-APINACA is banned in the Czech Republic.

See also 

 5F-ADB
 5F-AMB
 AB-FUBINACA
 AB-CHFUPYCA
 AB-PINACA
 ADB-CHMINACA
 ADB-FUBINACA
 ADB-PINACA
 ADBICA
 APICA
 APINACA
 FUB-APINACA
 MDMB-CHMICA
 PX-3

References

External links 
 

Adamantanes
Cannabinoids
Amines
Designer drugs

Organofluorides
Indazolecarboxamides